Roland Frank (10 October 1932 – 16 March 1991) was a British-Kenyan field hockey player. He competed in the men's tournament at the 1956 Summer Olympics.

References

External links
 

1932 births
1991 deaths
Kenyan male field hockey players
Olympic field hockey players of Kenya
Field hockey players at the 1956 Summer Olympics
Place of birth missing
Kenyan people of British descent
20th-century Kenyan people